Elyse Lemay-Lavoie (born 12 November 1994) is a Canadian water polo player who is a member of the Canada women's national water polo team. She was part of the team at the 2017 FINA World League, 2017 World Aquatics Championships, 2018 FINA World League, 2019 FINA World League, and 2019 Pan-American Games. She was part of the team in the women's water polo tournament at the 2020 Summer Olympics.

She played for the Université de Montréal's women's water polo team and University of Hawaii's women's water polo team.

References

External links 
 Lemay-Lavoie at swimswam

1994 births
Living people
Canadian female water polo players
Pan American Games medalists in water polo
Water polo players at the 2019 Pan American Games
Pan American Games silver medalists for Canada
Medalists at the 2019 Pan American Games
Water polo players at the 2020 Summer Olympics
Olympic water polo players of Canada